C-sharp major (or the key of C-sharp) is a major scale based on C, consisting of the pitches C, D, E, F, G, A, and B. It is enharmonically equivalent to D-flat major. Its key signature has seven sharps.

The C-sharp major scale is:

Its relative minor is A-sharp minor (or enharmonically B-flat minor) and its parallel minor is C-sharp minor.

A harp tuned to C-sharp major has all its pedals in the bottom position. Because all the strings are then pinched and shortened, this is the least resonant key for the instrument.

Compositions
Most composers prefer to use the enharmonic equivalent D-flat major since it only contains five flats as opposed to C-sharp major's seven sharps. However, Johann Sebastian Bach chose C-sharp major for Prelude and Fugue No. 3 in both books of The Well-Tempered Clavier. In Hungarian Rhapsody No. 6, Franz Liszt takes the unusual step of changing the key from D-flat major to C-sharp major near the start of the piece, and then back again to B-flat minor. Maurice Ravel selected C-sharp major as the tonic key of "Ondine" from his piano suite Gaspard de la nuit. Erich Wolfgang Korngold composed his Piano Concerto for the Left Hand, Op. 17, in C-sharp.

The Allegro de concierto by Spanish composer Enrique Granados is written in C-sharp major. Canadian composer and pianist Frank Mills originally wrote and performed his instrumental hit "Music Box Dancer" in C-sharp major; however, most modern piano editions have the piece written in C major.

Louis Vierne used C-sharp major for the "Dona nobis pacem" of the Agnus Dei of his Messe solennelle in C-sharp minor.

Further reading

External links
 List of compositions in C-sharp major

Musical keys
Major scales